The Root School is a historic school building at 987 Union Village Road in Norwich, Vermont.  Built in 1937, it is a rare late example of a one-room schoolhouse, made further distinctive by the survival of its original schoolroom interior.  The building was listed on the National Register of Historic Places in 2013.

Description and history
The Root School stands in a rural setting in eastern Norwich, on the north side of Union Village Road, a short way east of its junction with Goodrich Four Corners Road and Pattell Road.  It is a single-story wood-frame structure, with a hip roof, clapboard siding, and a foundation of concrete blocks and poured concrete.  The main entrance is in the western facade, facing the small parking area, and is sheltered by a gabled porch.  Sash windows line the western and southern facades.  The interior has a narrow vestibule, which opens into the main chamber.  It has a stage at one end, and retains original wood flooring, wainscoting, and a woodstove with an unusual safety enclosure. The stage is effectively recessed between a small kitchen (formerly a cloakroam) on one side, and bathrooms on the other.

The school was built in 1937, a fairly late period for the construction of these types of district school buildings.  It was used until 1946 for educational purposes, and has been used since then by a variety of community organizations, most recently as a community clubhouse.  It is unusual among one-room schoolhouses for retaining most of its original interior, which is often lost when such buildings are converted to other uses.  This school, along with the Beaver Meadow School, was among the last of the town's district schools to close.

See also
National Register of Historic Places listings in Windsor County, Vermont

References

Defunct schools in Vermont
School buildings on the National Register of Historic Places in Vermont
Buildings and structures in Norwich, Vermont
National Register of Historic Places in Windsor County, Vermont